The 1936 Oregon State Beavers football team represented Oregon State University in the Pacific Coast Conference (PCC) during the 1936 college football season.  In their fourth season under head coach Lon Stiner, the Beavers compiled a 4–6 record (3–5 against PCC opponents), finished in seventh place in the PCC, and outscored their opponents, 151 to 116.  The team played its home games at Bell Field in Corvallis, Oregon.

Schedule

Roster
HB Joe Gray, Jr.

References

Oregon State
Oregon State Beavers football seasons
Oregon State Beavers football